The Arab League Educational, Cultural and Scientific Organization (ALECSO) is a Tunis-based institution of the Arab League, established in accordance with article 3 of the Arab Cultural Unity Charter by an announcement made in Cairo, Egypt, on 25 July 1970. ALECSO works to coordinate cultural and educational activities in the Arab world.

Among its various activities, subsidiary ALECSO institutions have been established across the Arab world:
Arab Centre for Arabization, Translation, Authorship and Publication
Arabization Coordination Bureau
Institute of Arab Manuscripts
Institute of Arab Research and Studies
International Institute for the Arabic Language

Activities
Article 1 of ALECSO's constitution states that ALECSO seeks to achieve unity of thought in the Arab world through education, culture and science and to enhance the level of culture in the region, in order to keep up with and contribute to universal civilisation.

Arab Centre for Arabization, Translation, Authorship and Publication

The Arab Centre for Arabization, Translation, Authorship and Publication (ACATAP) is a Damascus-based institution, established in 1990 by an agreement between Syria and ALECSO. In pursuit of the goals of the Arabic Cultural Unity Charter and the ALECSO constitution, ACATAP aims to Arabize higher education in the Arab world, enrich Arab culture through the translation of works of foreign origin and share Arab achievements through the translation of Arabic works in the fields of science, art and literature into widely spoken foreign languages. The current director of ACATAP is Zaid Ibraheem Al Assaf.

Institute of Arab Research and Studies
The Institute of Arab Research and Studies (IARS) is a Cairo-based research institute administered by ALECSO. Established as an institution of the Arab League by resolution of the Council of the Arab League on 23 September 1952, the IARS started work on 1 November 1953. Following the creation of ALECSO in 1970, the IARS was brought under ALECSO's administrative control by resolution of the secretary-general dated 10 September 1970. The IARS was admitted to membership of the Federation of Arab Universities in 1994.

Organisation

Membership
There are 22 member-states of ALECSO, listed below by date of membership:
1970:         
1971:   
1972:  
1973: 
1974: 
1975: 
1976:  
1978: 
1985: 
2002:

See also
Institutions of the Arab League

References

External links
Arab League Educational, Cultural and Scientific Organization
Arab Centre for Arabization, Translation, Authorship and Publication
Arabization Coordination Bureau
Institute of Arab Research and Studies
Presentation of ALECSO by the German Konrad Adenauer Foundation

Arab League
International cultural organizations
International educational organizations
Organizations established in 1970
Organisations based in Tunisia